Josiah Marshall Heath (died 1851) was an English metallurgist, businessman and ornithologist, who invented the use of manganese to deoxidise steel. In India he learned the local steelmaking processes, including wootz, but having failed to found a profitable steel mill there he returned to England and settled in Sheffield. His patent kick-started Sheffield's steel industry, but the poor wording of his patent caused competitors not to pay him royalties, and he died in poverty.

Career in India 
At the start of the 19th century, metallurgy in British India was very traditional, localised and artisanal. Around 1825, Heath (who wanted to continue the important progress of European methods), obtained from the British East India Company the monopoly of iron production over a large area centred on Madras. In 1830, factories were built at Porto Novo, in the south of the Arcot district, with a government loan.

In 1833, the company was named the "Porto Novo Steel and Iron Company", the workshops were enlarged and a new factory was built at Beypore in the Malabar region. The steel was of very good quality, and was even exported to Great Britain where it was used, notably, in the construction of the Menai Suspension Bridge and the Britannia Bridge, across the Menai Straits between mainland Wales and Anglesey. But the business ran at a loss, because of management failings, technical inexperience, lack of funding and the sole use of charcoal as a combustion agent. (A buyer had previously suggested to Heath that he move his factory to the Burdwan district of Bengal, where coal was abundant, but he did not act on the suggestion.)

The business was taken over by the East India Company in 1853, who continued running it as a going concern until 1874, when it was placed into liquidation.

Career in England 
On returning to England, Heath profited from his experience and observations of traditional Indian metalworking. In 1839 he filed a patent concerning the use of a compound of manganese and carbon which he had invented and called "carbide". This is not what is now called carbide, but was a mixture of only those two elements.

This compound, together with the development of crucible steel, made the steel malleable when hot, and amenable to brazing and welding, even though the steel was formed from iron founded with addition of sulphur.

Manganese carbide, as described by Heath, was made by heating the crucible with a mixture of manganese oxide and tar: at high temperature the carbon in the tar causes an oxygen reduction ("redox") in the manganese oxide. Heating the mixture is a costly process, so Heath proposed that his licencees add the manganese and charcoal directly to the crucible so as to make crucible steel. The heat necessary to make the steel also means the charcoal contributes to the redox of the manganese oxide. But although Heath's process removes the need for preparing the carbide separately, it also involves a loss of control over the process. It is difficult to apply his invention in isolation, because making steel in a crucible requires the use of other methods which are always kept as trade secrets – so that other steel producers contested the validity of Heath's patent as describing his actual process. Heath's innovation worked, but nobody would pay royalties on it. After nine years of legal proceedings, the British House of Lords (then the highest court in the land) recognised the patent in its aspect of the first use of manganese oxide. Thomas Webster, one of Heath's lawyers, wrote:

Because of this, Heath was impoverished before he died. The general adoption of his process lowered the price of quality steel by 30% to 40% in the Sheffield market (Heath himself was content with a 2% reduction in the selling price).

Other work 
The Greater Asiatic yellow bat (Scotophilus heathi) was named in his honour after he presented the type specimen to the Zoological Society of London, together with a large collection of Asiatic birds.

References

Further reading 

Date of birth unknown
1851 deaths
Businesspeople in steel
English inventors
History of Sheffield
British metallurgists
People of the Industrial Revolution